Rojhan , is a (tehsil) located in Rajanpur District, Punjab, Pakistan. It is administratively subdivided into 8 Union Councils The headquarters of the tehsil is located at the town of Rojhan at the foot of the Suleiman Range near the tri-provincial boundary.

References

Rajanpur District
Tehsils of Punjab, Pakistan